Le Molay-Littry is a commune in the Calvados department in the Normandy region in northwestern France.

History
On 23 January 1969 Le Molay (the old INSEE code was 14434) merged with the old commune of Littry to form Le Molay-Littry, which uses the old Littry INSEE code 14370.

Le Molay-Littry has good travel links with neighbouring towns such as Isigny, Bayeux, Saint-Lô, and Balleroy, which served it well in the early 17th century. At that time, the town was a local source of coal which made the town a wealthy one. The town still has a mining museum which is open to the public.

Chateau du Molay
The Chateau du Molay was built on the northwest side of town about two and a half centuries ago in 45 acres of wooded grounds.

In 1758, a young Jacques-Jean le Coulteux du Molay (1740–1823), equerry to King Louis XV, and his wife Geneviéve –Sophie le Coulteux de la Noraye (painted below in 1788); built the chateau, his first large residence, in the heart of Normandy's woodland countryside, close to Rouen, his birthplace. Jacques-Jean was a wealthy and well known banker, who had one son (Jacques Félix Le Coulteux du Molay was born Paris 29 June 1779 and died in Dijon 1 April 1812) with Genevieve before their divorce. During their time together they also bought the famous Malmaison near Paris – some of those styles are reflected in the chateau you now stand. Jacques-Jean later married Alexandrine Sophie Pauline Le Couteulx; the couple had three children.

19th century
In 1833, Edouard, Count of Chabrol – Crousol, transformed and extended the chateau; giving it the architectural style it has today. The Count of Chabrol – Crousol was a member of the House of Peers, during the reign of Napoleon III. An art collector and avid book – lover, he was the grandfather of the French composer Vincent d'Indy who died in 1931. Edouard was the prefect of the Seine region of Paris and inaugurated the Palais Brongniart which was built by order of Napoleon Bonaparte to offer a permanent home to the Paris stock exchange in 1826.

At the end of the 19th century, the chateau became the property of the Viellard family.

World War II
There followed a sumptuous period of 50 years up to the dark hours of 1940 when the chateau was commandeered by the German Army.

The Balleroy and Molay-Littry area was one of the places where the Germans were setting up V-weapon installations, which though never used, is a fascinating and scary story. The chateau is one of the places were the weapons were planned to be launched from.  The devastating V2 weapon was the first ever ballistic missile. It was estimated that by the later stages of the war some 100 rockets per day could have launched. The area and the V-weapons project were under the control of Generalleutnant (General) Dietrich Kraiss and his 352nd Static Infantry Division.

Kraiss was a commander of the 90th Infantry Regiment (from September 1939 to March 1941), 168th Infantry Division (from July 1941 to March 1943) and 355th Infantry Division until May 1943. In November 1943 he took command of the 352nd Infantry Division which was in 1944, with six other divisions, located in Normandy in front of the Allied invasion. His 352nd Infantry Division had 7,400 soldiers and kept defensive positions around St. Lô. He was eventually killed in the fighting of Omaha Beach when one of their own mortars hit him blowing him to pieces. Dietrich Kraiss was born on 16 November 1889 in Stuttgart and died on 2 August 1944 – he was awarded the Knight's Cross with Oak Leaves for his services.

Tournières
Tournières is a little village not far from Molay-Littry where U.S. General Dwight D. Eisenhower established his first HQ in France code-named Shellburst. The success of the landings on 5 June 1944 led the Red Cross, and later the Maquis, to establish themselves here temporarily. Many important meetings took place at Shellburst. 

After the liberation of the area by Allied Forces in early June, engineers of the Ninth Air Force IX Engineering Command began construction of a combat Advanced Landing Ground outside of the town.  Declared operational on 25 June, the airfield was designated as "A-9", it was used by photo-reconnaissance units and various repair and support units until October when it was closed.

Surrounding area
A boarding school for girls from Saint–Lo, then a summer camp for Citroen both benefited from its peaceful grounds until 1978. At that time, the chateau was completely renovated and transformed into a three star hotel.
In February 1993, the Chateau du Molay was purchased by Travelbound, an English education travel company owned by specialist travel group Travelopia.

Population

International relations
The commune is twinned with:
Bovey Tracey (in Devon in the UK).
Dahlenburg (Germany)

See also
Communes of the Calvados department

References

Communes of Calvados (department)
Calvados communes articles needing translation from French Wikipedia